The spermatid is the haploid male gametid that results from division of secondary spermatocytes.  As a result of meiosis, each spermatid contains only half of the genetic material present in the original primary spermatocyte.  

Spermatids are connected by cytoplasmic material and have superfluous cytoplasmic material around their nuclei.

When formed, early round spermatids must undergo further maturational events to develop into spermatozoa, a process termed spermiogenesis (also termed spermeteliosis). 

The spermatids begin to grow a living thread, develop a thickened mid-piece where the mitochondria become localised, and form an acrosome.  Spermatid DNA also undergoes packaging, becoming highly condensed.  The DNA is packaged firstly with specific nuclear basic proteins, which are subsequently replaced with protamines during spermatid elongation.  The resultant tightly packed chromatin is transcriptionally inactive.

In 2016 scientists at Nanjing Medical University claimed they had produced cells resembling mouse spermatids artificially from stem cells.  They injected these spermatids into mouse eggs and produced pups.

DNA repair

As postmeiotic germ cells develop to mature sperm they progressively lose the ability to repair DNA damage that may then accumulate and be transmitted to the zygote and ultimately the embryo.  In particular, the repair of DNA double-strand breaks by the non-homologous end joining pathway, although present in round spermatids, appears to be lost as they develop into elongated spermatids.

Additional images

References

External links
  - "Male Reproductive System: testis, early spermatids"
  - "Male Reproductive System: testis, late spermatids"
 Histology at okstate.edu

Reproductive system
Germ cells
Andrology